Susheela Gopalan (29 December 1929, at Muhamma, in Alappuzha, Kerala – 19 December 2001, at Thiruvananthapuram, Kerala) was an Indian Communist leader and one of the founding members of the Communist Party of India (Marxist).

Life

She was elected Member of Parliament thrice, from Ambalappuzha (1967), Alappuzha (1980) and Chirayinkil (1991), and was a Minister in the Government of Kerala for a number of years. Born to the famous kalari family, Cheerappanchira in Muhamma, she was educated in Alappuzha and Trivandrum and joined the Communist Party. She married A. K. Gopalan in 1952, one of the veterans of the party, who she had met during his years in hiding.

She was one of the few women who held major responsibilities in the CPI (M) structure. She was a Minister in a number of LDF cabinets in Kerala. During her last term she was the Minister for Industries and Social Welfare. She lost by one vote to E. K. Nayanar in an election for chief ministership in the state committee of CPI(M), in whose cabinet she became the Minister for Industries and Social Welfare.

References

External links
Condolence by the Polit-bureau
Interview concerning Kerala's Industrial Policy
Jeevitha Katha
List of members of the 4th Lok Sabha#Kerala

1929 births
2001 deaths
Communist Party of India (Marxist) politicians from Kerala
Malayali politicians
India MPs 1991–1996
Lok Sabha members from Kerala
Women in Kerala politics
People from Alappuzha district
20th-century Indian women politicians
20th-century Indian politicians
Women members of the Lok Sabha
Communist Party of India politicians from Kerala